The Chinook River is a short stream located near the mouth of the Columbia River in the U.S. state of Washington.

Course
The Chinook River originates just north of the Astoria–Megler Bridge, near Scarboro Hill in the Willapa Hills. The river flows west and northwest, just north of Fort Columbia State Park, Chinook Point, and the small town of Chinook on the Columbia River.

Its lower course runs through the Chinook Wildlife Area. Baker Bay is part of the Columbia River Estuary and located just east of Cape Disappointment and the Pacific Ocean.

See also
 List of rivers of Washington
 Tributaries of the Columbia River

References

Rivers of Washington (state)
Rivers of Pacific County, Washington
Tributaries of the Columbia River